Zana Marjanović (born 31 May 1983) is a Bosnian actress best known for her leading role in Angelina Jolie's directorial debut In the Land of Blood and Honey (2011). She is an alumna of Academy of Performing Arts in Sarajevo.

Filmography
Films
Ljeto u zlatnoj dolini (Summer in the Golden Valley, 2003)
Teško je biti fin (It's Hard to be Nice, 2007)
Snijeg (Snow, 2008)
Snovi (Dreams, 2008)
Transfer (2010)
In the Land of Blood and Honey (2011)
Broken (2012)
A Rose in Winter (2018)

Television
Crna hronika (Black Chronicle, 2004)
Lud, zbunjen, normalan (Crazy, Confused, Normal, 2007–10); recurring role in 29 episodes
60 Minutes (2011)
This Week (2011)
Tavis Smiley (2011–12); 2 episodes
Charlie Rose (2011)
Priče iza diskrecione linije (Stories Behind the Line of Discretion, 2012)
New Year's Eve with Magacin Kabare (2012)
The Game (UK TV series) (2014)

Shorts
Prva plata (Paycheck, 2005)

References

External links

1983 births
Living people
Bosniaks of Bosnia and Herzegovina
Bosnia and Herzegovina film actresses
Actresses from Sarajevo
Bosnia and Herzegovina television actresses
21st-century Bosnia and Herzegovina actresses